Reinado Internacional del Café 2008, was held in Manizales, Colombia on January 12, 2008. 21 contestants attended the event. The winner was Jessica Jordan from Bolivia.

Results

Contestants

References

External links
 Instituto de Cultura y Turismo de Manizales
 Alcaldía de Manizales
 REINADO INTERNACIONAL DEL CAFE
 
 
 

2008
2008 beauty pageants
2008 in Colombia